Rogle is a village in the municipality of Želino, North Macedonia.

Demographics
As of the 2021 census, Rogle had 532 residents with the following ethnic composition:
Albanians 492
Persons for whom data are taken from administrative sources 40

According to the 2002 census, the village had a total of 566 inhabitants. Ethnic groups in the village include:
Albanians 556
Others 10

References

External links

Villages in Želino Municipality
Albanian communities in North Macedonia